Myrmecia browningi is an Australian bull ant species, a part of the genus Myrmecia. They are native to Australia and have primarily only been seen in South Australia.

The Myrmecia browningi looks similar to any bull ant that is similar to the jack jumper ant, excluding that its mandibles and legs are dark colours. The species was first described by Ogata & Taylor in 1991.

References

Myrmeciinae
Hymenoptera of Australia
Insects described in 1991
Insects of Australia